1276 papal conclave or 1276 papal election may refer to:
 January 1276 papal conclave, which elected Innocent V to succeed Gregory X
 July 1276 papal conclave, which elected Adrian V to succeed Innocent V
 September 1276 papal election, which elected John XXI to succeed Adrian V